The Shree Padmanabhaswamy Temple is a Hindu temple located in Thiruvananthapuram, the capital of the state of Kerala, India. The name of the city of 'Thiruvananthapuram' in Malayalam and Tamil translates to "The City of Lord Ananta" (Ananta being a form of Vishnu). The temple is built in an intricate fusion of the Chera style and the Dravidian style of architecture, featuring high walls, and a 16th-century gopura. While as per some traditions the Ananthapura temple in Kumbla in Kasaragod district in Kerala is considered as the original spiritual seat of the deity ("Moolasthanam"), architecturally to some extent, the temple is a replica of the Adikesava Perumal temple in Thiruvattar in Kanyakumari district in Tamil Nadu.

The principal deity is Padmanabhaswamy (Vishnu), who is enshrined in the "Anantha Shayana" posture, the eternal yogic sleep on the infinite serpent Adi Shesha. Padmanabhaswamy is the tutelary deity of the Travancore royal family. The titular Maharaja of Travancore, Moolam Thirunal Rama Varma, is the current trustee of the temple.

History

Several extant Hindu texts including the Vishnu Purana, Brahma Purana, Matsya Purana, Varaha Purana, Skanda Purana, Padma Purana, Vayu Purana and Bhagavata Purana mention the Padmanabhaswamy Temple. The Temple has been referred to in the (only recorded) Sangam period literature several times. Many conventional historians and scholars are of the opinion that one of the names that the Temple had, "The Golden Temple", was in cognisance of the Temple being already unimaginably wealthy by that point (early Sangam period). Many extant pieces of Sangam Tamil literature and poetry as well as later works of the 9th century of Tamil poet–saints like Nammalwar refer to the temple and the city as having walls of pure gold. Both the temple and the entire city are often eulogised as being made of gold, and the temple as heaven.

The temple is one of the 108 principal Divya Desams ("Holy Abodes") in Vaishnavism according to existing Tamil hymns from the seventh and eighth centuries C.E and is glorified in the Divya Prabandha. The Divya Prabandha glorifies this shrine as being among the 13 Divya Desam in Malai Nadu (corresponding to present-day Kerala with Kanyakumari District). The 8th century Tamil poet Alvar Nammalvar sang the glories of Lord Padmanabha.

It is believed that Parasurama purified and venerated the idol of Sree Padmanabhaswamy in Dvapara Yuga. Parasurama entrusted 'Kshethra karyam' (Administration of the Temple) with seven Potti families – Koopakkara Potti, Vanchiyoor Athiyara Potti, Kollur Athiyara Potti, Muttavila Potti, Karuva Potti, Neythasseri Potti and Sreekaryathu Potti. King Adithya Vikrama of Vanchi (Venad) was directed by Parasurama to do 'Paripalanam' (Protection) of the Temple. Parasurama gave the Tantram of the Temple to Tharananallur Namboothiripad. This legend is narrated in detail in the Kerala Mahathmyam which forms part of the Brahmanda Puranam.

Another version regarding the consecration of the principal idol of the Temple relates to the legendary sage Vilvamangalathu Swamiyar. Swamiyar, who resided near Ananthapuram Temple in Kasaragod District, prayed to Lord Vishnu for his darshan or "auspicious sight". The Lord is believed to have come in the guise of a little boy who was mischievous. The boy defiled the idol which was kept for puja. The sage became enraged at this and chased away the boy who disappeared before him. Realising the boy was no ordinary mortal, the sage wept for forgiveness and asked for another darshan as a sign. He heard a voice say "If you want to see me come to the Anathavana (the unending forest or Ananthakadu). After a long search, when he was walking on the banks of the Laccadive Sea, he heard a pulaya lady warning her child that she would throw him in Ananthankadu. The moment the Swami heard the word Ananthankadu he was delighted. He proceeded to Ananthankadu based on the directions of the lady of whom he enquired. The sage reached Ananthankadu searching for the boy. There he saw the boy merging into an iluppa tree (Indian butter tree). The tree fell down and became Anantha Sayana Moorti (Vishnu reclining on the celestial snake Anantha). But the edifice that the Lord assumed was of an extraordinarily large size, with His head at Thiruvattar near Thuckalay, Tamil Nadu, body or udal at Thiruvananthapuram, and lotus-feet at Thrippadapuram near Kulathoor and Technopark (Thrippappur), making him some eight miles in length. The sage requested the Lord to shrink to a smaller proportion that would be thrice the length of his staff. Immediately the Lord shrank to the form of the idol that is seen at present in the Temple. But even then many iluppa trees obstructed a complete vision of the Lord. The sage saw the Lord in three parts – thirumukham, thiruvudal and thrippadam. The swami prayed to Padmanabha to be forgiven. He offered rice kanji and uppumanga (salted mango pieces) in a coconut shell to the Perumal which he obtained from the pulaya woman. The spot where the Sage had darsan of the Lord belonged to Koopakkara Potti and Karuva Potti. With the assistance of the reigning King and some Brahmin households a temple was constructed. The Ananthankadu Nagaraja Temple still exists to the northwest of the Padmanabhaswamy Temple. The samadhi (final resting place) of the swamiyar exists to the west of the Padmanabhaswamy Temple. A Krishna temple was built over the samadhi. This temple, known as Vilvamangalam Sri Krishna Swami Temple, belongs to Thrissur Naduvil Madhom.

Mukilan, a Muslim marauder, invaded vast chunks of Venad in 1680 AD. He destroyed Budhapuram Bhaktadasa Perumal Temple owned by Neythasseri Potti. Mukilan had plans to plunder the vaults of Sree Padmanabhaswamy Temple and destroy it. But he was dissuaded from doing so by local Muslims loyal to the royals of Venad. Padmanabhan Thampi, arch rival of Anizhom Thirunal Marthanda Varma, marched to Thiruvananthapuram with his forces and tried to loot the vaults of the Temple. Thampi stayed at Sri Varaham and sent his mercenaries to Sree Padmanabhaswamy Temple. It is said that divine serpents materialised in hundreds and scared away Thampi's men. Emboldened by this heavenly intervention, Pallichal Pillai and local people opposed Padmanabhan Thampi and ensured that the mercenaries did not proceed with the misadventure.

Travancore royal family
In the first half of the 18th century, in line with matrilineal customs, Anizham Thirunal Marthanda Varma, succeeded his uncle Rama Varma as king at the age of 23. He successfully suppressed the 700-year-old stranglehold of the Ettuveetil Pillamar ("Lords of the Eight Houses") and his cousins following the discovery of conspiracies which the lords were involved in against the royal house of Travancore (There are various legends and disputes about these mostly apocryphal stories, but overall, he took control and centralised the rule). The last major renovation of the Padmanabhaswamy temple commenced immediately after Anizham Thirunal's accession to the throne and the idol was reconsecrated in 906 ME (1731 CE). On 17 January 1750, Anizham Thirunal surrendered the Kingdom of Travancore to Padmanabhaswamy, the main deity at the temple, and pledged that he and his descendants would be vassals or agents of the deity who would serve the kingdom as Padmanabha Dasa. Since then, the name of every Travancore king was preceded by the title 'Sree Padmanabha Dasa'; the female members of the royal family were called 'Sree Padmanabha Sevinis' both meaning the servant to Padmanabhaswamy; . The donation of the king to Padmanabhaswamy was known as Thrippadi-danam. The final wishes of Anizham Thirunal on his passing at the age of 53 clearly delineated the historical relationship between the Maharaja and the temple: "That no deviation whatsoever should be made in regard to the dedication of the kingdom to Padmanabhaswamy and that all future territorial acquisitions should be made over to the Devaswom."

Temple structure

Main shrine
In the Garbhagriha, Padmanabha reclines on the serpent Anantha  or Adi Sesha. The serpent has five hoods facing inwards, signifying contemplation. The Lord's right hand is placed over a Shiva lingam. Sridevi-Lakshmi, the Goddess of Prosperity and Bhudevi the Goddess of Earth, two consorts of Vishnu are by his side. Brahma emerges on a lotus, which emanates from the navel of the Lord. The deity is made from 12,008 saligramams. These saligrams are from the banks of the Gandaki River in Nepal, and to commemorate this, certain rituals used to be performed at the Pashupatinath Temple. The deity of Padmanabha is covered with, "Katusarkara yogam", a special ayurvedic mix which is made of 108 natural materials collected from all over India and forms a coat-like protection that keeps the deity clean. The daily worship is with flowers, and for the abhishekam, special deities are used.

The platforms in front of the vimanam and where the deity rests are both carved out of a single massive stone and hence called "Ottakkal-mandapam". At the same time, Marthanda Varma also brought 12,000 shaligrams, aniconic representations of Vishnu, from the Gandaki River, north of Benares (now known as Varanasi) to the temple. These were used in the reconsecration of Lord Padmanabha.

In order to perform darshan and puja, one has to ascend to the mandapam. The deity is visible through three doors – the visage of the reclining Lord and Siva Linga underneath his hand is seen through the first door; Sridevi and Bhrigu Muni in Katusarkara, Brahma seated on a lotus emanating from the Lord's navel, hence the name, "Padmanabha", gold abhisheka moorthies of Padmanabha, Sridevi and Bhudevi, and silver utsava moorthi of Padmanabha through the second door; the Lord's feet, and Bhudevi and Markandeya Muni in Katusarkara through the third door. The idols of two goddesses holding chamaram, Garuda, Narada, Tumburu, the divine forms of the six weapons of Vishnu, Surya, Chandra, the Saptarshi, Madhu, and Kaitabha are also in the Sanctum. Only the King of Travancore may prostrate on the "Ottakkal Mandapam" It is traditionally held that anybody who prostrates on the mandapam has surrendered all that he possesses to the Deity. Since the ruler has already done that, he is permitted to prostrate on this mandapam.

Other shrines
Inside the Temple, there are two other important shrines, Thekkedom and Thiruvambadi, for the Deities, Ugra Narasimha and Krishna Swami respectively.

Centuries back, several families of Vrishni Kshatriyas travelled to the south, carrying with them idols of Lord Balarama and Lord Krishna. When they reached the hallowed land of Sree Padmanabha, they gave the idol of Balarama, also known as Bhaktadasa, to Neythasseri Potti. Neythasseri Potti built a Temple at Budhapuram in the present day Kanyakumari District and had this idol installed there. The Vrishnis gifted the idol of Krishna to Maharaja Udaya Marthanda Varma of Venad. The Maharaja constructed a separate shrine, known as Thiruvambadi, in the premises of Padmanabhaswamy Temple for this idol. The Thiruvambadi shrine enjoys an independent status. Thiruvambadi has its own namaskara mandapam, bali stones and flagmast. The Lord of Thiruvambadi is Parthasarathi, the Divine Charioteer of Arjuna, who is the warrior prince and one of the main protagonists that appear in the story of Mahabharata. The two-armed granite idol, with one hand holding the whip and the other resting on the left thigh holding the conch close to it, is in standing posture. On Ekadasi days, the Lord is dressed and decorated as Mohini. The Vrishnies who came to Venad and settled there are known as Krishnan Vakakkar as they belong to the lineage of Lord Krishna.

There are also shrines for Lord Rama accompanied by his consort Sita, brother Lakshmana and Hanuman, Vishwaksena (the Nirmalyadhari of Vishnu and Remover of Obstacles), Vyasa and Ashwatthama the Chiranjivis, Ganapati, Sasta, and Kshetrapala (who guards the temple). Grand idols of Garuda and Hanuman stand with folded hands in the Valiya balikkal area. The thevara idols of Chithira Thirunal Balarama Varma and Uthradom Thirunal Marthanda Varma are housed in the south east part of the Temple.

Gopuram
The foundation of the present gopuram was laid in 1566. The temple stands by the side of a tank, named Padma Theertham (meaning the lotus spring). The temple has a corridor with 365 and one-quarter sculptured granite-stone pillars with elaborate carvings which stands out to be an ultimate testimonial for the Vishwakarma sthapathis in sculpting this architectural masterpiece. This corridor extends from the eastern side into the sanctum sanctorum. An  flagstaff stands in front of the main entry from the prakaram(closed precincts of a temple). The ground floor under the gopuram (main entrance in the eastern side) is known as the 'Nataka Sala' where the famous temple art Kathakali was staged in the night during the ten-day uthsavam (festival) conducted twice a year, during the Malayalam months of Meenam and Thulam.

Temple rituals

Festivals and rites

There are many festivals associated with this temple. The major festivals are bi-annual. The Aipasi festival and the Panguni festival in the Tamil month of aipasi (October/November) and Panguni (March/April) respectively, lasts for 10 days each. On the ninth day the Maharajah of  the Travancore, in his capacity as Thrippappoor Mooppan, escorts the deities to the vettakkalam for Pallivetta. Centuries back, the Pallivetta procession was said to pass through Kaithamukku, Kuthiravattom (Kunnumpuram), Pazhaya Sreekanteswaram and Putharikkandam. The festivals culminate with the Aarat (holy bath) procession to the Shankumugham Beach. The word Aarat refers to the purificatory immersion of the deities of the temple in sea. This event takes place in the evening. The Maharajah of Travancore escorts the Aarat procession on foot. The festival idols "Utsava Vigrahas" of Padmanabhaswamy, Narasimha Moorthi and Krishna Swami are given a ritual bath in the sea, after the prescribed pujas. After this ceremony, the idols are taken back to the temple in a procession that is lit by traditional torches, marking the conclusion of the festival.

A major annual festival related to Padmanabhaswamy temple is the Navaratri festival. The idols of Saraswati Amman, Mun Uditha Nangai (Parasakti, who appeared before Saraswati, Lakshmi and Parvati to help them identify their husbands who had been transformed into infants by the power of chastity of Anasuya) and Kumara Swami (Murugan) are brought from the Padmanabhapuram Palace, Suchindram, and Kumarakovil respectively to the Kuthira malika palace in front of Padmanabhaswamy temple as a procession. This festival lasts for 9 days. The famous Swathi Sangeethotsavam music festival is held every year during this festival in the Navratri mandapam and in some other surrounding temples. The festival was named in honour of the Maharajah of Travancore, Swathi Thirunal Rama Varma and is organized by his descendant in the Royal Family, Prince Rama Varma.

The biggest festival in this temple is laksha deepam, which means hundred thousand (or one lakh) lamps. This festival is unique and commences once in 6 years. Prior to this festival, chanting of prayers and recitation of three vedas is done for 56 days (Murajapam). On the last day, hundred thousand oil lamps are lit in and around the temple premises.

Priests
Temples where 'Swamiyar Pushpanjali' is conducted are claimants to extra sanctity. Sannyasins from Naduvil Madhom and Munchira Madhom do Pushpanjali (flower worship) daily to Padmanabha, Narasimha Moorthi and Krishna Swami. Tharananallur Nambuthiripads of Iranjalakkuda are the Tantris of the Temple. The Nambies, altogether four in number, are the Chief Priests of the Temple. Two Nambies – Periya Nambi and Panchagavyathu Nambi – are allotted to Padmanabha and one Nambi each to Narasimha Moorthi and Krishna Swami. The Nambies hail from either side of the Chandragiri River.

Temple entry 
In line with the Temple Entry Proclamation, only those who profess the Hindu faith are permitted entry to the temple and devotees have to strictly follow the dress code. Men wear "vesti" with "angavastram" (the South Indian version of dhoti and shawl both of which are plain white in color) and women wear sari.

Temple management

The Padmanabhaswamy Temple and its property were controlled by the Ettara Yogam (King and Council of Eight) with the assistance of Ettuveetil Pillamar ("Lords of the Eight Houses"). The Ettara Yogam consists of Pushpanjali Swamiyar, six member Thiruvananthapurathu Sabha, Sabhanjithan (Secretary) and Arachan (Maharaja of Travancore). Thiruvananthapurathu Sabha was primarily responsible for the administration of the Temple. Koopakkara Potti, Vanchiyoor Athiyara Potti, Kollur Athiyara Potti, Muttavila Potti, Karuva Potti and Neythasseri Potti are the members of the Sabha. The Pushpanjali Swamiyar presides over the meetings of the Sabha. Sreekaryathu Potti is the Sabhanjithan of the Sabha. Any decision taken by the Sabha can be implemented only if the Maharaja of Travancore approves of it. It is believed that eight members of Ettara Yogam (seven Potties and the Maharaja of Travancore) received their rights from Lord Parashurama Himself.

In the past, only the Swamiyars of the Naduvil Madhom were appointed as Pushpanjali Swamiyars by the Maharaja of Travancore. Anizham Thirunal Marthanda Varma curtailed the authority of Ettara Yogam and liquidated the powerful Ettuveetil Pillamar. Ettara Yogam became an advisory and assenting body thereafter. Besides the Naduvil Madhom, the Munchira Madhom got the right to appoint Pushpanjali Swamiyars during his reign. In the recent past, Uthradom Thirunal Marthanda Varma gave Pushpanjali rights to the Swamiyars of Thrikkaikattu Madhom and Thekke Madhom as well. Though the Maharaja is the appointing authority of the Pushpanjali Swamiyar, the former must do a Vechu Namaskaram when he sees the Swamiyar. With the passing away of Uthradom Thirunal Marthanda Varma in December 2013, his nephew Moolam Thirunal Rama Varma became the titular Maharaja of Travancore in January 2014. Like his predecessors, Moolam Thirunal also got concurrence from the Ettara Yogam before assuming the title 'Maharaja'. In the presence of the Maharaja designate, the Yogathil Pottimar and the Tantri, the Pushpanjali Swamiyar Maravanchery Thekkedathu Neelakanta Bharatikal signed on the Neettu (Order) of the Ettara Yogam accepting Moolam Thirunal as Chirava Mootha Thiruvadi (Maharaja of Travancore) and Thrippappoor Mootha Thiruvadi (Protector of the Temple). This ceremony took place at Kulasekhara Mandapam in Padmanabhaswamy Temple. Revathi Thirunal Balagopal Varma, grandson of Maharani Regent Pooradom Thirunal Sethu Lakshmi Bayi, is the titular Elayaraja of Travancore.

Extant temple records

A pertinent event in the long history of the temple was the construction of a "granta-pura" (record-room) within the temple compound itself around 1425 A.D. by the then Venad King Veera Iravi Iravi Varma, to store the "Mathilakam" (within-the-walls) records, as the then existing temple records were known. A major portion of those records (over 3000 'Cadjan' leaf-records) from the Mathikalam had been donated later to the Archives Department in 1867 at the time of the formation of the latter. Each of these Cadjan leaf-records, which have been compiled over thousands of years, contains 10,000 documentations according to R. Nagaswamy, noted archaeologist and historian, totalling over 30 crores of records. Despite their cultural value, only a minuscule portion of these grantas (bundles) of cadjan leaf records, written mostly in ancient scripts of proto-Tamil and archaic-Malayalam, have been deciphered. The translations of this section of manuscripts by some scholars serve as a rare though very inadequate primary source material on the temple and its rich traditions.

The rest of these Mathilakam documents – segregated under 70 "heads" – is still lying idle with the Archives Department. According to Aswathi Thirunal Gouri Lakshmi Bayi, a member of the Travancore Royal Family and author of a book on the temple, from a very early period in recorded history the temple had employed two kinds of 'record writers'. One group was to record the proceedings and transactions of the Ettarayogam, a council of temple administrators, that included the then king. The other was to write and preserve the records of the day-to-day functioning of the temple, maintain correct accounts of the temple-treasury, and of temple-revenue-collections and temple-expenditure and as well as to note down all the other records, connected with the functioning of the temple.

Temple assets

The temple and its assets belong to Lord Padmanabhaswamy and were for a long time controlled by a trust which was headed by the Travancore royal family. However, at present (since July 2020), the Supreme Court of India has divested the Travancore royal family from leading the management of the temple. T P Sundararajan's litigations changed the way the world looked at the Temple.

In June 2011, the Supreme Court of India directed the authorities from the archaeology department and the fire services to open the secret chambers of the temple for inspection of the items kept inside. The temple has six hitherto known vaults (nilavaras), labelled as A to F, for bookkeeping purpose by the Court. (Since, however, an Amicus Curie Report by Justice Gopal Subramaniam, in April 2014, has reportedly found two more further subterranean vaults that have been named G and H.) While vault B has been unopened over centuries, A was possibly opened in the 1930s, and vaults C to F have been opened from time to time over recent years. The two priests of the temple, the 'Periya Nambi' and the 'Thekkedathu Nambi', are the custodians of the four vaults, C to F, which are opened periodically. The Supreme Court had directed that "the existing practices, procedures, and rituals" of the temple be followed while opening vaults C to F and using the articles inside, while Vaults A and B would be opened only for the purpose of making an inventory of the articles and then closed. The review of the temple's underground vaults was undertaken by a seven-member panel appointed by the Supreme Court to generate an inventory, leading to the enumeration of a vast collection of articles that are traditionally kept under lock and key. A detailed inventory of the temple assets, consisting of gold, jewels, and other valuables is yet to be made.

While vault B remains unopened, vaults A, C, D, E, and F were opened along with some of their antechambers. Among the reported findings, are a three-and-a-half feet tall solid pure golden idol of Mahavishnu, studded with hundreds of diamonds and rubies and other precious stones. Also found were an 18-foot-long pure gold chain, a gold sheaf weighing , a  golden veil, 1200 'Sarappalli' gold coin-chains that are encrusted with precious stones, and several sacks filled with golden artefacts, necklaces, diadems, diamonds, rubies, sapphires, emeralds, gemstones, and objects made of other precious metals. Ceremonial attire for adorning the deity in the form of 16-part gold anki weighing almost , gold "coconut shells" studded with rubies and emeralds, and several 18th century Napoleonic era coins were found amongst many other objects. In early 2012, an expert committee had been appointed to investigate these objects, which include lakhs of golden coins of the Roman Empire, that were found in Kottayam, in Kannur District. Also found was a pure golden throne, studded with hundreds of diamonds and other precious stones, meant for the 18-foot-long deity. As per one of the men, who was among those that went inside this Vault A, several of the largest diamonds were as large as a full-grown man's thumb. According to varying reports, at least three, if not more, of solid gold crowns have been found, studded with diamonds and other precious stones. Some other media reports also mention hundreds of pure gold chairs, thousands of gold pots and jars, among the articles recovered from Vault A and its antechambers.

This revelation has solidified the status of the Padmanabhaswamy Temple as the wealthiest place of worship in the world. If the antique and cultural value were taken into account these assets could be worth ten times the current market price.

As a reference, the entire GDP (revenues in all forms) of the Mughal Empire at its very zenith under Aurangzeb (in 1690), was a comparatively meagre US$90 billion in modern-day terms. In fact, at its richest, the Mughal "treasury" (in Akbar's and Jahangir's and Shah Jahan's periods) consisted of seven tonnes of gold, along with eighty pounds of uncut diamonds, a hundred pounds each of rubies and emeralds and six hundred pounds of pearls.

Even with only the five smaller of the reported eight vaults being opened (the larger three vaults and all their ante-chambers still remaining closed), the treasure found so far, is considered to be by far the largest collection of items of gold and fully precious stones in the recorded history of the world.

The valuables are believed to have been accumulated in the temple over several thousand years, having been donated to the deity (and subsequently stored there), by various dynasties like the Cheras, the Pandyas, the Travancore Royal Family, the Kolathiris, the Pallavas, the Cholas and many other kings in the recorded history of both South India and beyond, and from the rulers and traders of Mesopotamia, Jerusalem, Greece, Rome, and later, the various colonial powers from Europe, and other countries as well. Some people have suggested that a part of the stored riches reached the Travancore kings in the later years in the form of tax as well as conquered wealth of other South Indian kingdoms. Most scholars however believe that this was accumulated over thousands of years, given the mention of the Deity and the Temple in several extant Hindu Texts, the Sangam Tamil literature (500 BC to 300 AD wherein it was referred to as the "Golden Temple" on account of its then unimaginable wealth), and the treasures consist of countless artefacts dating back to the Chera, Pandya, Greek, and Roman epochs. The ancient late-Tamil-Sangam epic Silappatikaram (c 100 AD to 300 AD at the latest) speaks of the then Chera King Cenkuttuvan receiving gifts of gold and precious stones from a certain 'Golden Temple' (Arituyil-Amardon) which is believed to be the Padmanabhaswamy Temple. Gold had been panned from rivers as well as mined in Thiruvananthapuram, Kannur, Wayanad, Kollam, Palakkad and Malappuram districts for thousands of years. The Malabar region (as a part of the "Tamilakam" region of recorded history) had several centers of trade and commerce since the Sumerian period ranging from Vizhinjam in the south to Mangalore in the north. Also, at times like the invasion by Mysore in the late 1700s, the other related royal families (of the Travancore Royal Family) in Kerala and the far south, like the Kolathiris, took refuge in Thiruvananthapuram and stored their temple-wealth for safekeeping in the Padmanabhaswamy Temple. Also, much of the treasures housed in the much larger and as-yet-unopened vaults, as well as in the much smaller cellars that have been opened, date back to long before the institution of the so-called Travancore Kingdom, e.g. the  hoard of gold coins from 200 B.C that was mentioned by Vinod Rai. Noted archaeologist and historian R. Nagaswamy has also stated that several records exist in Kerala, of offerings made to the Deity, from several parts of Kerala. Lastly, it has to be remembered that in the Travancore Kingdom, a distinction was always made between the Government (State) Treasury (Karuvelam), the Royal Family Treasury (Chellam), and the Temple Treasury (Thiruvara Bhandaram or Sri Bhandaram). During the reign of Maharani Gowri Lakshmi Bayi, hundreds of temples that were mismanaged in the Kerala region, were brought under the Government. The excess ornaments in these temples were also transferred to the Vaults of the Padmanabhaswamy Temple. Instead the funds of the Padmanabhaswamy Temple were utilised for the daily upkeep of these temples.

On 4 July 2011, the seven-member expert team tasked with taking stock of the temple assets decided to postpone opening of chamber B. This chamber is sealed with an iron door, with the image of a cobra on it, and has not been opened due to the belief that opening it would result in much misfortune. The royal family has also said that opening chamber B could be a bad omen. The seven-member team will consult with some more experts on 8 July 2011, and may make a final decision on opening chamber B. An Ashtamangala Devaprasnam conducted in the Temple to discern the will of the Lord revealed that any attempts to open chamber B would cause divine displeasure, and that the holy articles in the other chambers were defiled in the inventorying process. The original petitioner (T. P. Sundarajan), whose court action led to the inventory, died in July 2011, adding credence to the folklore around the temple. Prior to this now-famous incident in July 2011, one of the several vaults in the temple which was not vaults B (untouched after the 1880s), G, or H (both rediscovered supposedly by the Amicus Curie only in mid-2014), was opened in 1931. This was possibly an antechamber of vaults A, C, D, E, or F that may not have been opened yet. This was necessitated due to the severe economic depression that India was going through. The Palace and State Treasuries had run almost dry. The small group of people, including the king and the priests, found a granary-sized structure almost full with mostly gold and some silver coins and jewels. Surmounted on top of it were hundreds of pure gold pots. There were four coffers filled with gold coins as well. Also found was a larger chest fixed to the ground with six sections in it. They were full of gold jewelry encrusted with diamonds, rubies, sapphires, and emeralds. Besides these, there were four more chests of old coins (not of gold), and they were carried back to the Palace and state treasuries for counting.

Vault (Nilavara) B ("The Forbidden Zone")
The Bhagavata Purana says that Balarama visited Phalgunam (more commonly known as Thiruvananthapuram), took bath in Panchapsaras (Padmateertham) and made a gift of ten thousand cows to holy men. Though the sannidhyam of Lord Padmanabha has always been present in the holy land of Thiruvananthapuram, and it was a very ancient and renowned pilgrim spot even during the time of Balarama, the present-day temple for the deity came up later. The southwest part of the Chuttambalam was constructed at the holy spot where Lord Balarama is believed to have donated cows to holy men. This portion came to be known as Mahabharatakonam and covered the ground underneath which both Kallara B and Kallara A were situated.

According to a popular legend, many devas and sages devoted to Lord Balarama visited him on the banks of Padmateertham. They requested him that they may be permitted to reside there worshipping the lord. Balarama granted them their wish. It is believed that these devas and sages reside in Kallara B worshipping the Lord. Naga Devathas devoted to the lord also dwell in this Kallara. Kanjirottu Yakshi, whose enchanting and ferocious forms are painted on the south-west part of the main Sanctum, resides in this Kallara worshipping Lord Narasimha. Holy objects like Sreechakram were installed beneath this Kallara to enhance the potency of the Principal Deity. Lord Ugra Narasimha of Thekkedom is said to be the Protector of Kallara B. There is a serpent's image on Kallara B indicating danger to anyone who opens it. A four-day Ashtamangala Devaprasnam conducted in August 2011 declared Kallara B as "forbidden zone".

One of the oldest existing estimates regarding only Vault B, which can be considered to be at least as reliable as any other made since the discovery of the hidden treasure (or assets) of the Temple in 2011, was by the Travancore Royal Family itself in the 1880s (when an older existing inventory and estimate were last updated). According to it, the gold and precious stones contained in Vault B, which is by far the largest and the only vault (of the reported six) that is unopened so far, since the discovery of the treasure, was worth INR 12,000 Crores in the then (1880s') terms. Considering the subsequent inflation of the rupee and the increase in the prices of gold and precious stones since in general, the treasure in the unopened vault B alone would be worth at least US$ One Trillion in July 2011 terms, without the cultural value being factored in. The price of gold in the 1880s, when the inventory and estimate were last updated, was INR 1.8 per gram (The price of gold was about US$18 for an ounce in the 1880s when the dollar was 3.3 to the rupee). In fact, going by these figures, the gold in Vault B could potentially run into many more trillions of dollars even before the cultural or historical value is factored in.

It is highly unlikely that Kallara B was opened after the 1880s. An article by Emily Gilchrist, a visiting Englishwoman in the 1933, recalls in her book 'Travancore: A Guide Book for the Visitor' (Oxford University Press, 1933) about an unsuccessful attempt to open one Kallara in 1908: "About 25 years ago, when the State needed additional money, it was thought expedient to open these chests and use the wealth they contained." "A group of people" got together and attempted to enter the vaults with torches. When they found the vaults  "infested with cobras" they "fled for their lives.

In 2011, the antechamber to Kallara B was opened by the Observers appointed by the Supreme Court of India. But the Observers could not open Kallara B. However, Gopal Subramanium in his report submitted to the Supreme Court in April 2014, recommended its opening after conducting another Devaprasnam. The two Pushpanjali Swamiyars are the highest spiritual dignitaries of Padmanabhaswamy Temple. The Pushpanjali Swamiyar of Naduvil Madhom sent letters to the Chairperson of the Administrative Committee and the Executive Officer on 8 February 2016 expressing his strong opposition to the opening of Kallara B. The Pushpanjali Swamiyar of Munchira Madhom led a Ratha Yathra from Kasaragod to Thiruvananthapuram in May 2018 campaigning against opening the sacred Kallara. Azhvanchery Thamprakkal, the supreme spiritual leader of Kerala Brahmins, while addressing a meeting held in connection with the Ratha Yathra, also demanded that faith should not be trampled upon by opening Kallara B.

According to a report by former Comptroller and Auditor General of India Vinod Rai, at least the outer door to Kallara B has been opened a number of times in recent decades - twice in 1991 and five times in 2002. Once Vinod Rai's report was out, Princess Aswathi Thirunal Gowri Lakshmi Bayi clarified that Mr Rai was referring to the antechamber to Kallara B, which was opened even in 2011 by the Supreme Court-appointed observers.

Controversies
The Kerala High Court ruled in 2011 that the state government should take over the control of the temple and its assets, but the Travancore royal family appealed to the Supreme Court. An independent report was commissioned, and was completed in November 2012, finding no evidence that the royal family were expropriating the treasures.

As of April 2016, vaults B, G, and H along with their several ante-chambers were yet to be opened; while inventorying of the items in vaults C, D, E, and F were completed (in August 2012) and formal inventorying of vault A had commenced. Several hundred pots and other items made of gold, that are used for daily rituals or intermittently for ceremonies in the Temple, were not inventoried as the Temple-priests expressed strong objections. Over 1.02 lakh "articles" had been retrieved from Vault A and its ante-chambers, until that point, though only a small part of them had been inventoried then. An "article" could be either an individual item, or collections of several items, examples of the latter being a cache of 1.95 lakh 'Rassappanams' (Gold coins) weighing 800 kg and sets of Navaratnas (collections of nine different kinds of diamonds). There are over 60,000 fully precious stones set as parts of larger pieces of gold jewellery among those items inventoried as of March 2013. The results of the inventory are not to be released until the completion of the whole process by order of the Supreme Court of India.

In April 2014, Amicus Curiae advocate Gopal Subramaniam filed a 577-page report to the Supreme court of India alleging malpractices in the administration of the temple. According to him, the authorities failed to perform their ethical duties by opening many bank accounts, trusts and also not filing Income Tax returns for the past ten years. He alleged that Vault B was opened despite a previous ruling of the Supreme court prohibiting the same.

The report states – "The large amount of gold and silver, the discovery of which was a shock to the Amicus Curiae, is a singular instance of mismanagement. The presence of a gold plating machine is also yet another unexplained circumstance. This discovery raises a doubt of the organized extraction by persons belonging to the highest echelons. There appears to be resistance on the part of the entire State apparatus in effectively addressing the said issues. The lack of adequate investigation by the police is a telling sign that although Thiruvananthapuram is a city in the State of Kerala, parallelism based on monarchic rule appears to predominate the social psyche." The Supreme court bench comprising justice R. M. Lodha and justice A. K. Patnaik ordered a change in administration by forming a 5-member committee and appointing Vinod Rai as auditor. The committee will include Thiruvananthapuram District judge K. P. Indira, Thantri and Nambi of the temple and two members to be decided in consultation with the Government of Kerala. Additionally, IAS officer and former administrator of the temple, K. N. Satish was appointed as executive officer. The Government of Kerala agreed to comply with the Supreme court order. Moolam Thirunal Rama Varma remains the trustee of the temple and still does the ritual duties as the titular Maharaja of Travancore, but has no responsibility regarding the temple management after the interim ruling by the Supreme Court The report also found the existence of two more vaults that were never even made mention of or hitherto spoken about.

The report named them Vault 'G' and Vault 'H'. Like Vault 'B' and all its antechambers, both these vaults and their antechambers were yet to be opened as of May 2014. The report also mentions that Mr. Subramanian found several large trunks filled with artefacts made of precious metals and precious stones outside of the eight vaults and their antechambers.

The CBI and the Intelligence Bureau have red-flagged the appointment of Gopal Subramaniam as a Judge in the Supreme Court. The IB cites Mr Subramaniam's report on Sree Padmanabhaswamy Temple as one of the instances where he relied heavily on his spiritual instincts rather than rational logic and hard facts. In his second report on Sree Padmanabhaswamy Temple, Mr Subramaniam himself reveals,"It was his morning ritual of [shutting] his mind and seeking guidance, which resulted in discoveries in this direction."

The Amicus Curiae has also been accused of conducting poojas in the Temple in violation of its customs. He performed poojas at the Thevarappura in the Temple and in front of the Vedavyasa Shrine. Despite opposition from the Royal Family and the Tantries of the Temple, he pulled out a stone Yantra from the nearby Marthandan Madhom Palace and did pooja on it for several days. The Tantries explained that the Yantram had no connection with the Padmanabhaswami Temple and that it was for the protection of the Palace. But the Amicus Curiae insisted on having it installed in the Sanctum Sanctorum of the Temple. Due to severe opposition from the Tantries the Yantram remains where it was. Every morning, Lord Padmanabha is to be awakened only by blowing the conch shell and chanting the Sripada Sooktham. But the Amicus Curiae introduced the daily rendering of Venkatesa Suprabhatam to awaken the Lord. The Supreme Court requested the Tantri to take the final decision on whether the Suprabhatam could be sung. Following that, the Senior Tantri Nedumpilli Tharananalloor Parameswaran Namboothiripad directed the Temple authorities to stop the chanting of Suprabhatam forthwith, as it was causing 'Anya Mantra Yajana Dosham' (affliction due to worshipping the Deity with incompatible mantras) to the Presiding Deity and the Temple. As atonement for this dosham, the Tantri wants Vedic scholars to chant 12 'muras' each of Rig Veda and Yajur Veda. In his first report to the Supreme Court, the Amicus Curiae directed the Tantries to examine whether a Sri Yantra can be installed in the Sanctum Sanctorum, in front of the utsava moorthi.

On 13 July 2020, overturning the January 2011 judgment of the Kerala high court, the Supreme Court of India ruled that the Padmanabhaswamy Temple administration and control would be done by the erstwhile Travancore royal family.

See also

 Padmanabhaswamy Temple treasure
 Thirumal in Thiruvananthapuram
 Temples of Kerala
 Attukal Temple
 Vellayani Devi Temple
 Methan mani, clock tower adjoining the temple

References

External links

 
 Sree Padmanabhaswamy Temple (Information About Sree Padmanabhaswamy]
 Padmanabhaswamy Temple treasures belong to royal family: Sankaracharya
 Padmanabhaswamy temple tour information

Vishnu temples
Divya Desams
Hindu pilgrimage sites in India
Hindu temples in Thiruvananthapuram
Monuments of National Importance in Kerala
Tourist attractions in Thiruvananthapuram
Vaishnavism
Travancore royal family
Tamilakam
Mahavishnu temples in Kerala